Plastic is the third studio album by guitarist Joey Tafolla, released on July 16, 2001 through Mascot Records.

Track listing

Personnel
Joey Tafolla – guitar, production
Billy Batte – keyboard, synthesizer
Allen Less Silva – keyboard sequencing
Tal Bergman – drums
Oskar Cartaya – bass
Matt Fronke – trumpet
Wendell Keily – trombone
Ray Herman – saxophone
Ken Tamplin – production

References

Joey Tafolla albums
2001 albums